Uvariodendron is a genus of plants in the family Annonaceae.

 It contains the following species (but this list may be incomplete):
 Uvariodendron anisatum Verdc.
 Uvariodendron connivens (Benth.) R.E.Fries
 Uvariodendron fuscum (Benth.) R.E.Fries
 Uvariodendron giganteum (Engl.) R.E.Fr.
 Uvariodendron gorgonis Verdc.
 Uvariodendron kirkii Verdc.
 Uvariodendron occidentale Le Thomas
 Uvariodendron oligocarpum Verdc.
 Uvariodendron pycnophyllum (Diels) R.E. Fr.
 Uvariodendron usambarense R.E. Fr.

 
Annonaceae genera
Taxonomy articles created by Polbot